Mark McLane is a Canadian politician, who was elected to the Legislative Assembly of Prince Edward Island in a byelection on November 15, 2021. He represents the electoral district of Cornwall-Meadowbank as a member of the Prince Edward Island Progressive Conservative Party.

Electoral record

References

Living people
People from Queens County, Prince Edward Island
Progressive Conservative Party of Prince Edward Island MLAs
21st-century Canadian politicians
Year of birth missing (living people)